Luniz (formerly Luniz Toons and LuniTunes), is an American hip hop duo from Oakland, California, formed by Yukmouth and Numskull. They were signed to Virgin Records, Noo Trybe Records, and C-Note Records. They were the flagship act for C-Note Records. The group is best known for the internationally successful hit in 1995 titled "I Got 5 on It", known as a weed-smoking anthem.

Discography

Studio albums
Operation Stackola (1995)
Lunitik Muzik (1997)
Silver & Black (2002)
High Timez (2015)
No Pressure (2018)

Extended plays
Formally Known as the LuniTunes (1994)

Filmography
 1996—Original Gangstas, as customers at Thelma's Café

Awards

Grammy Award nominations

References

Musical groups from Oakland, California
San Francisco Bay Area
Virgin Records artists
African-American musical groups
Musical groups established in 1992
American musical duos
Hip hop duos
Rappers from the San Francisco Bay Area
1992 establishments in California